The Madurai–Tirunelveli Line is a railway line connecting the major cities of Madurai and Tirunelveli in the state of Tamil Nadu in India. The line was inaugurated on 1 January 1876. This Rail route is under control of Southern Railways. It covers the distance of 157.1 km. The line covers the districts of Tirunelveli, Thoothukudi, Viruthunagar, Madurai. The speed limit for most of this rail is 100 km/h.

History 
The line was inaugurated on 1 January 1876. The conversion from meter gauge to broad gauge completed on 4 August 1981. The gauge conversion process was performed by retaining the old meter gauge line and constructing the new line on the other side to avoid extended cancellation of service. The electrification process for the line started in January 2010 and completed in January 2015.

Stations 

Track doubling and electrification 
The line has been fully electrified since 3 January 2015, The doubling process started in January 2018 and was planned out in different phases. The project is expected to be completed in 2022. The first phase (Gangaikondan-VanchiManyachi and Kadambur-Thattaparai) was commissioned in 2020. The Tirunelveli - Gangaikondan and Kadambur - Kovilpatti sections was commissioned on 28 February 2021. The Tirumangalam-Thulukapatti double line with electrification has done in March 2021.

As of January 2022, Tirunelveli-Kovilpatty stretch and Thulukkapatty to Thirumangalam stretch of the line have been doubled. (i.e. 67% of the works are completed).

References 

Southern Railway zone
Rail transport in Tamil Nadu
5 ft 6 in gauge railways in India